Army of Islam (Jaysh al-Islam; ; Turkish: Kafkas İslâm Ordusu) may refer to:

Jaysh al-Islam, a Syrian rebel group
Army of Islam (Gaza Strip), a Palestinian organization based in the Gaza Strip
Army of Islam (Ottoman Empire), a unit in the Ottoman army during World War I